Hirtella enneandra is a species of plant in the family Chrysobalanaceae. It is endemic to Colombia.

References

enneandra
Endemic flora of Colombia
Endangered plants
Taxonomy articles created by Polbot